The Mediterranean Dialogue, first launched in 1994, is a forum of cooperation between NATO and seven countries of the Mediterranean. Its stated aim is "to create good relations and better mutual understanding and confidence throughout the region, promoting regional security and stability and explaining NATO's policies and goals."

The Dialogue reflects NATO's view that security in Europe is tied to the security and stability in the Mediterranean. It also reinforces and complements the Euro-Mediterranean Partnership and the Organization for Security and Co-operation in Europe's Mediterranean Initiative.

Members

The Mediterranean Dialogue initially started with five countries but has added two more over time.

  (joined in March 2000)
  (joined in February 1995)
  (joined in February 1995)
  (joined in November 1995)
  (joined in February 1995)
  (joined in February 1995)
  (joined in February 1995)

Libya
In the 2012 Chicago Summit, NATO heads of states issued a declaration, citing Libya was "welcome" as a NATO partner "if it so wishes", through Mediterranean Dialogue. Libya has yet to respond.

Individual Cooperation Programme (ICP)
On October 16, 2006, NATO and Israel finalized the first-ever Individual Cooperation Programme (ICP) under the enhanced Mediterranean Dialogue, where Israel will be contributing to the NATO maritime Operation Active Endeavour. The ICP covers many areas of common interest, such as the fight against terrorism and joint military exercises in the Mediterranean Sea. More ICP agreements were signed with Egypt (2007) and Jordan (2009), and NATO expects further agreements to be signed with additional Mediterranean Dialogue member states in the future.

See also
 Istanbul Cooperation Initiative
 North Atlantic Council
 Partnership for Peace
 Union for the Mediterranean

References

External links
 Mediterranean Dialogue website

Politics of NATO
Mediterranean
1994 in international relations